Wells House and Gardens is a Victorian tudor gothic country house museum, located around 7 km outside of Kilmuckridge, County Wexford. It was designed by Daniel Robertson (of Powerscourt and Kilruddery House in County Wicklow and Johnstown Castle) in the 1830s. It replaced the original house which was built in the late seventeenth century by the former Cromwellian army officer John Warren, and bought after his death by the eminent judge Sir Robert Doyne: the Doyne family lived here until 1964. 

It was opened to the general public in July 2012 and is the most visited attraction in the county of Wexford, being named "Ireland's Best Family Day Out" by Today FM in 2015. The house has extensive gardens, an animal farm, a cafe and a children's playground. Archery and falconry are also practised. It is found on the R741 road, near the small village of Ballyedmond and about 18 km south of Gorey. It features as a suggested stop on the Ireland's Ancient East touring area. A number of local businesses have been housed on the grounds, including a wildlife sanctuary which closed in 2016.

Awards
 AIB North Wexford Tourism Award 2015 - Gorey chamber of commerce
 Ireland's Best Family Day Out 2015 - Today FM

References

Official Website

Historic house museums in the Republic of Ireland
Museums in County Wexford